Countess Sophia Andreyevna Tolstaya (née Behrs; , sometimes anglicised as Sofia Tolstoy, Sophia Tolstoy and Sonya Tolstoy; 22 August 1844 – 4 November 1919), was a Russian diarist, and the wife of Russian writer Count Leo Tolstoy.

Biography

Sophia Behrs was one of three daughters of a German physician Andrey Evstafievich Behrs (1808–1868) and his Russian wife Liubov Alexandrovna Islavinа (1826–1886). Her maternal great-grandfather, Count Pyotr Zavadovsky, was the first Minister of education in Russia's history. Sophia was first introduced to Leo Tolstoy in 1862 when she was 18 years old. At 34, Tolstoy was 16 years her senior. On 17 September 1862 the couple became formally engaged after Tolstoy gave Sophia a written proposal of marriage, marrying a week later in Moscow. 
At the time of their marriage, Leo Tolstoy was well known as a novelist after the publication of The Cossacks. On the eve of their marriage, Tolstoy gave Sophia his diaries that detailed his sexual relations with female servants. In Anna Karenina, 34-year-old Konstantin Levin, a semi-autobiographical character behaves similarly, asking his 19-year-old fiancée Kitty to read his diaries and learn of his past transgressions. The diary included the fact that Tolstoy had fathered a child by a woman who remained on the Yasnaya Polyana estate.

Tolstoya was pregnant 16 times, three of her pregnancies ended in miscarriages. The Tolstoys had 13 children, eight of whom survived childhood. With the growing interest of her husband in spiritual matters, Tolstoya took over the running of the family estate. Sophia acted as copyist of War and Peace, copying and editing the manuscript seven times from beginning to end at home at night by candlelight after the children and servants had gone to bed, using an inkwell pen and sometimes requiring a magnifying glass to read her husband's notes.

In 1887, Tolstaya regained interest in the relatively new art of photography, which she had learned at age 16. She took over 1,000 photographs that documented her life, including with Tolstoy, and the decline of the Russian Empire. She was a diarist and documented her life with Leo Tolstoy in a series of diaries which were published in English translation in the 1980s. Tolstaya wrote her memoirs as well, which she titled My Life.

The marriage of Tolstoya and Leo Tolstoy is considered as one of the famously unhappy marriages of literary history. Their children took sides in the marital discord. Their daughter Alexandra was supporting her father, whereas their son Leo Junior favoured his mother. Tolstaya was struggling with Leo Tolstoy's increasing devotion to spiritual matters and his neglect of their family life. The couple argued over Tolstoy's desire to give away all his private property. Leo Tolstoy left Tolstoya abruptly in 1910, aged 82, with their daughter Alexandra, and his doctor, Dushan Makovicki (Dušan Makovický). Leo Tolstoy left out of anger after he overheard Tolstaya searching his study. She would have been searching for his will that she was concerned Tolstoy wanted to change. Leo Tolstoy died 10 days later in the hamlet of Astapavo, and Sophia was kept away from him (as depicted in the film The Last Station). Following the death of her husband, Sophia continued to live in Yasnaya Polyana and survived the Russian Revolution in relative peace. She died on 4 November 1919.

Controversy related to Leo Tolstoy's The Kreutzer Sonata
In 1889, Leo Tolstoy published his book The Kreutzer Sonata. The book advocated for sexual abstinence. Its narrator murders his wife in a fit jealousy. Although quickly banned from publication by censorship, the novel had been assumed in the Russian society to be describing the unhappy marriage of Leo Tolstoy and Tolstaya, which greatly offended Tosltaya.
Tolstaya wrote two novellas as a response to The Kreutzer Sonata, which both remained unpublished until 2000. The two novellas are Whose Fault? written between 1891 and 1894 and Song Without Words written in 1898. In both, the character of the husband is portrayed as a man insensitive to the needs of his wife.
Despite her objections to The Kreutzer Sonata, Tolstaya helped lift the ban on the publication of the novel. She obtained an audience with Tsar Alexander III in 1891, who accepted that the novel be included in a broader publication of Leo Tolstoy's books.

In popular culture
She was portrayed by Helen Mirren in the 2009 The Last Station, based on the 1990 biographical novel of the same name by Jay Parini, and Leo Tolstoy was portrayed by Christopher Plummer. Both actors were nominated for Academy Awards in their respective categories. Her life was also serialised in August 2010 by BBC's Radio 4 with the title A Simple Life.
In 2022, Tolstoya was the main character of the film A Couple by Frederick Wiseman. French actress Nathalie Boutefeu is cast as Tolstoya in the film, which consists of monologues based on Tolstoya's diaries.

Works
Many works of Tolstoya were published postmortem and long after being written. This is because Tolstaya was critical of Leo Tolstoy in her writing and the Russian authorities did not want the status of the famous author tarnished. 
Some of the literary work of Tolstaya was published more than a century after she wrote it.

List of publications
 The Countess Tolstoy's Later Diary 1891-1897 London, Victor Gollancz, 1929 - translated by Alexander Werth
 Autobiography of Sophie Andreevna Tolstoi online at archive.org
 The Memoirs of Sofia Tolstoy, which she titled My Life – at University of Ottawa Press
 Whose Fault?, Oktyabr 1994/10, 6-59. German Translation: Eine Frage der Schuld, Zürich 2008. English translation: Sophia Tolstoy's rebuttal of her husband Leo's accusations, The Edwin Bellen Press, New York 2010
 Song without Words, unpublished in Russia. German Translation: Lied ohne Worte, Zürich 2010.
 Cathy Porter (tr), The Diaries of Sophia Tolstoy (London: HarperCollins, 2010).

References

Further reading
 Ursula Keller, Natalja Sharandak. Sofja Andrejewna Tolstaja. Ein Leben an der Seite Tolstojs, Frankfurt, M. Leipzig: Insel Verlag (2009)
 Lew Tolstoj - Sofja Tolstaja: Eine Ehe in Briefen. Ed. and trans. from Russian by Ursula Keller, Natalja Sharandak. Berlin: Insel Verlag (2010)
 
 
 Anne Edwards. Sonya: The Life of Countess Tolstoy (1981)
 Cynthia Asquith. Married to Tolstoy (1960)
 Ursula Keller/Natalya Sharandak: Sofya Andreyevna Tolstaya: Ein Leben an der Seite Tolstojs. Frankfurt am Main, Germany, 2009
 Nina Niktina. Sofya Tolstaya. Moscow, 2010
 Alexandra Popoff. Sophia Tolstoy. A Biography. Free Press, 2010

External links
 Writers and their wives: Together in love, work and legacy, rbth.ru, 20 January 2014

1844 births
1919 deaths
Sophia
Russian memoirists
Leo Tolstoy
Women writers from the Russian Empire
Countesses of the Russian Empire
Russian photographers
Russian people of German descent
Women memoirists
19th-century writers from the Russian Empire
19th-century women writers from the Russian Empire
Place of birth missing